T'ongch'ŏn County is a kun, or county, in Kangwŏn province, North Korea.  It abuts the Sea of Japan (East Sea of Korea) to the north and east.  Famous people from T'ongch'ŏn include Hyundai Founder Chung Ju-yung, who is believed to have been born there.

History
The region was called Hyuyang county during the reign of King Gwanggaeto. The region became part of Silla during the reign of King Jinheung,

Administrative divisions
T'ongch'ŏn county is divided into 1 ŭp (town) and 30 ri (villages):

Physical features
The terrain is mountainous in the west, sloping down to the coastal plains (including the T'ongch'ŏn Plain and Hupkok Plain) in the east. The plains are used for rice cultivation. The area is prone to fog. As elsewhere along the Kangwŏn coast, there are various lagoons.

Economy
Due to the extensive plains, agriculture is a major local industry; in addition to rice, the county produces barley, wheat, oats, millet, maize, soybeans, and potatoes. Lumbering and fishing also play a role.

Tourism
The region has long been a popular destination due to the proximity of Mount Kŭmgang and, in recent years, tourists from South Korea have passed through the area in great numbers.

Transport
Road
A highway runs along the coastline.

Rail
T'ongch'ŏn county is served by T'ongch'ŏn Station and five other stations on the Kŭmgangsan Ch'ŏngnyŏn Line of the Korean State Railway.

Notable people from Tongchon County
 Chung Ju-yung, South Korean entrepreneur, businessman and the founder of Hyundai Group
 Ri Yong-ho, North Korean vice-marshal
 Ri Chun-hee, North Korean broadcaster for Korean Central Television

See also
Geography of North Korea
Administrative divisions of North Korea

References

External links 
 

Counties of Kangwon Province (North Korea)